Southern Wisconsin Regional Airport  is a public airport located southwest of Janesville and north of Beloit in Rock County, Wisconsin, United States. Formerly known as Rock County Airport, it is owned and operated by the Rock County government. The airport has no scheduled commercial passenger service.

It is included in the Federal Aviation Administration (FAA) National Plan of Integrated Airport Systems for 2021–2025, in which it is categorized as a national general aviation facility.

Southern Wisconsin Regional Airport was once home to the annual Southern Wisconsin AirFEST.

History

Several Rock County farms provided land for contract glider pilot training to the United States Army Air Forces in 1942. Training was provided by Morey Airplane Company using three turf runway locations in three township sections. C-47 Skytrains and Waco CG-4 unpowered Gliders were not used. The production CG-4A gliders were not delivered until after these northern civilian schools were closed. Aircraft furnished by the Army were single engine L type Cessna, Aeronca and Piper. There were no gliders and there was no glider towing. These schools became known as dead stick training.

The mission of the school was to train glider pilot students in approaches with the engine off, landing at a mark, night landing and strange field landing. Ground school instruction was in navigation, maintenance, meteorology, instruments, aircraft identification, chemical warfare defense, customs of service and physical training and drill.

These schools were inactivated at the end of 1942 or sooner. The farm fields used in Rock County were turned back to the farmers when the schools were closed. None of this glider pilot training in Rock County occurred at or on the current Southern Wisconsin Regional Airport space.

SWRA has, in the past, had scheduled airline passenger service. In 1979, it had service to Chicago-O'Hare on Republic Airlines and Midstate Airlines.

Facilities and aircraft
It contains three runways:
 Runway 14/32: 7,302 x 150 ft (2,226 x 46 m), surface: concrete, with approved ILS and GPS approaches
 Runway 4/22: 6,701 x 150 ft (2,042 x 46 m), surface: asphalt, with approved ILS and GPS approaches
 Runway 18/36: 5,004 x 75 ft (1,525 x 23 m), surface: asphalt

For the 12-month period ending December 31, 2021, the airport had 54,744 aircraft operations, an average of 150 per day: 90% general aviation, 10% air taxi and less than 1% military. In January 2023, there were 70 aircraft based at this airport: 37 single-engine, 2 multi-engine, 27 jet and 4 helicopters.

The airport has an FBO that offers fuel as well as hangar parking, catering, courtesy cars, a conference room, a crew lounge, snooze rooms, and more.

Southern Wisconsin AirFest 
The Southern Wisconsin AirFest was an annual air show that hosted North American jet teams, such as the Blue Angels, the Thunderbirds and the Masters of Disaster. The event was discontinued following the 2012 season.

Headliners 
 2003: The U.S. Air Force Thunderbirds were scheduled to perform but, due to an accident in late September, they were unable to perform at the show. In their place was the CF-18 Hornet
 2004: U.S. Air Force Thunderbirds
 2005: U.S. Navy Blue Angels
 2006: U.S. Air Force F-16 Viper East Demo Team
 2007: U.S. Air Force F-16 Viper East Demo Team and Codename: Mary's Lamb
 2008: Canadian Armed Forces Snowbirds
 2009: U.S. Navy Blue Angels
 2010: U.S. Air Force Thunderbirds and Canadian Armed Forces Snowbirds
 2011: VFA-122 Super Hornet West Coast Demo Team
 2012: United States Army Golden Knights Parachute Team and Black Diamond Jet Team

Accidents & Incidents
On August 27, 1999, a Walker Breezy was destroyed on takeoff when it impacted terrain. The aircraft was starting on a cross-country flight to Beloit, Wisconsin. Witnesses say the plane climbed steeply and began a left turn. The plane then turned back to the right and fishtailed, poirposed, and began another right turn before pitching straight down and impacting terrain. The airline transport pilot onboard was fatally injured.
On February 16, 2021, a homebuilt Velocity V-Twin crashed after departure from Janesville. The plane had originally arrived from Appleton International Airport and departed for Florida after refueling. Roughly one minute from departure, the plane's pilots requested a return to the airport. The plane eventually crashed into trees one mile south of the airport in a reported steep dive. The aircraft received substantial damage and both pilots onboard died.

See also

 Wisconsin World War II Army Airfields
 31st Flying Training Wing (World War II)
 List of airports in Wisconsin

References

Other sources

 
 Manning, Thomas A. (2005), History of Air Education and Training Command, 1942–2002.  Office of History and Research, Headquarters, AETC, Randolph AFB, Texas 
 Shaw, Frederick J. (2004), Locating Air Force Base Sites, History’s Legacy, Air Force History and Museums Program, United States Air Force, Washington DC. 
 1943 Glider Program Studies, USAF Historical Studies, Maxwell.

External links
 Southern Wisconsin Regional Airport
  at Wisconsin Department of Transportation
 Southern Wisconsin AirFEST, official site
 
 

1942 establishments in Wisconsin
Airports established in 1942
Airfields of the United States Army Air Forces in Wisconsin
Airports in Wisconsin
Buildings and structures in Rock County, Wisconsin
USAAF Contract Flying School Airfields
Former Essential Air Service airports
USAAF Glider Training Airfields